Organization science may refer to:
 Organizational studies, a scientific field
 Organization Science (journal)